Wilmington Manor is a census-designated place (CDP) in north-eastern New Castle County, Delaware, United States. The population was 7,889 at the 2010 census.

Geography
Wilmington Manor is located at  (39.6867795, -75.5843695). It is just northwest of the city of New Castle and south of the City of Wilmington.

Neighborhoods
West Wilmington Manor
Wilmington Manor Park
Chelsea Estates
Leedom Estates
Hampton Walk

East Wilmington Manor
Penn Acres
Schoolside
Wilmington Manor Gardens
Stockton

Demographics

In 2010, Wilmington Manor had a population of 7,889 people. The racial makeup of the CDP was 68.6% White, 15.5% African American, 0.5% Native American, 1.1% Asian, 0.0% Pacific Islander, 11.4% from other races, and 3.0% from two or more races. 19.7% of the population were Hispanic or Latino of any race.

At the 2000 census there were 8,262 people, 3,040 households, and 2,173 families in the CDP. The racial makeup of the CDP was 79.33% White,  10.95% African American, 0.19% Native American, 0.85% Asian, 0.06% Pacific Islander, 6.69% from other races, and 1.92% from two or more races. Hispanic or Latino of any race were 12.96%.

Of the 3,040 households 31.3% had children under the age of 18 living with them, 52.3% were married couples living together, 13.2% had a female householder with no husband present, and 28.5% were non-families. 22.5% of households were one person and 10.1% were one person aged 65 or older.  The average household size was 2.72 and the average family size was 3.14.

The age distribution was 24.8% under the age of 18, 9.4% from 18 to 24, 30.3% from 25 to 44, 21.7% from 45 to 64, and 13.8% 65 or older.  The median age was 36 years. For every 100 females, there were 102.5 males.  For every 100 females age 18 and over, there were 101.1 males.

The median household income was $43,434 and the median family income  was $48,920. Males had a median income of $36,111 versus $27,743 for females. The per capita income for the CDP was $18,934.  About 5.5% of families and 9.4% of the population were below the poverty line, including 10.5% of those under age 18 and 6.6% of those age 65 or over.

Education
The CDP is part of the Colonial School District., which operates William Penn High School.

Wilmington University has its main campus in the CDP.

References

External links

Census-designated places in New Castle County, Delaware
Census-designated places in Delaware